Claire Agnes Galligan (September 24, 1895 in New York – October 8, 1978 in Los Angeles, California) was an American freestyle swimmer who won 13 AAU championships over distances ranging from 220 yd to 3 miles. In 1916 she became the first female AAU champion, and on September 13, 1917, she set a world record over 500 yd at 7:31.4. She missed the 1916 Olympics due to World War I, and by the 1920 Games was married to Edgar Finney and retired from swimming. In 1970 she was inducted into the International Swimming Hall of Fame.

See also
 List of members of the International Swimming Hall of Fame

References

1895 births
1978 deaths
American female freestyle swimmers
20th-century American women
20th-century American people